The Campaign to Organize Digital Employees or CODE-CWA is a project launched by the Communications Workers of America to unionize tech and video game workers in January 2020. It sprung out of conversations with Game Workers Unite (GWU) and employed at least two full time staff, including GWU co-founder Emma Kinema and veteran SEIU organizer Wes McEnany. In 2022, Jessica Gonzalez joined, a former Activision Blizzard QA tester. 

CODE-CWA campaigns have been launched at a range of workplaces such as major multinational tech companies, small startups, video game studios, media companies, AAA game publishers, worker co-operatives, and table-top game companies. As of August 2022, CODE-CWA has organized over 3000 union members in various sub-industries of the tech sector across over 25 bargaining units in the last two years of organizing. 



Campaigns

See also 

Alphabet Workers Union
Game Workers Unite
 Google worker organization
 Tech unions in the United States
 Tech Workers Coalition

References

External links 
 

Trade unions in the United States
worker organization

Labor relations in the United States
Tech sector trade unions
Communications Workers of America